Shaikh Salahuddin may refer to:

Sheikh Salahuddin (Karachi politician) (born 1956)
Shaikh Salahuddin (Hyderabad politician) (fl. 2008)
Sheikh Salahuddin (cricketer) (1969–2013)